CNS may refer to:

Science and medicine
 Central nervous system
 Clinical nurse specialist
 Coagulase-negative staphylococcus
 Connectedness to nature scale
 Conserved non-coding sequence of DNA
 Crigler–Najjar syndrome
 Crystallography and NMR system, a software library
 Color Naming System

Military
 CNS (chemical weapon), a mixture of chloroacetophenone, chloropicrin and chloroform
 Chief of the Naval Staff (disambiguation), in several countries
 Former Taiwanese navy ship prefix

Education
 Cicero-North Syracuse High School, New York, US
 City of Norwich School, England
 Computation and Neural Systems, a Caltech program

Organisations
 Canadian Nuclear Society
 Congress of Neurological Surgeons
 US Corporation for National Service, later Corporation for National and Community Service
 Council for National Security, 2006 military of Thailand
 Szekler National Council, Romania
 Chinese Nuclear Society

Media
 Catholic News Service
 China News Service
 CNSNews, formerly Cybercast News Service

Other
 Cairns International Airport, IATA code
 Chateau Neuf Spelemannslag, Norwegian folk music group
 Chinese National Standards
 Communication, navigation and surveillance, in air traffic management
 Custody Notification Service, Australian advice service
 "Cell, Nature, or Science" : a "CNS Paper" means a scientific publication in one of these high-evaluated scientific journals

See also